was a Japanese billionaire property developer and the head of EIE International Corp.

Early life
Harunori Takahashi came from a prominent family in western Japan, near Nagasaki, and was descended from a pre-war Prime Minister. His father Yoshiharu Takahashi saved EIE from bankruptcy in June 1975.

Career
Takahashi was head of the privately owned EIE International Corp, which at one time owned one trillion yen in real estate assets.

In 1986, EIE acquired a 35% stake in Regent Hotels & Resorts.  In 1989, Takahashi started building what was to become The Regent New York on 57th Street, designed by I. M. Pei.  In a 1991 New York Times profile, he was compared to Donald Trump, as a "brash" developer with a "hectic pace of property acquisitions", under pressure from banks and "struggling under $6 billion in shaky debt".

At his peak, Takahashi owned Regent and Hyatt hotels across Asia, a floating hotel in Vietnam's Ho Chi Minh City, 50% of Australia's Bond University, Denarau Island in Fiji, and was building a thousand-mile railway in Australia's.

EIE sold Regent to Four Seasons Hotels in 1992 and the New York hotel eventually opened as the Four Seasons Hotel New York.

Personal life
He was married to Aki Takahashi, and they had two children, Ichiro Takahashi and Makiko Komai.

Takahashi died on 18 July 2005, aged 59, following a brain haemorrhage in a hospital in Tokyo.

References

1940s births
2005 deaths
Japanese billionaires